Wurmbea tubulosa, also known as Long-flowered Nancy, is a species of plant in the Colchicaceae family that is endemic to Australia. It is classified as Endangered under Australia's EPBC Act.

Description
The species is a cormous perennial herb that grows to a height of 10–30 cm. Its white to pink flowers appear from June to August.

Distribution and habitat
The species occurs in the vicinity of Geraldton in the Avon Wheatbelt and Geraldton Sandplains IBRA bioregions of Western Australia. It grows in clay and loam soils on riverbanks and in seasonally wet areas.

References

tubulosa
Monocots of Australia
Angiosperms of Western Australia
Plants described in 1878
Taxa named by George Bentham